Attila Bónis (born 2 April 1971) is a Hungarian alpine skier. He competed at the 1992 Winter Olympics and the 1994 Winter Olympics.

References

1971 births
Living people
Hungarian male alpine skiers
Olympic alpine skiers of Hungary
Alpine skiers at the 1992 Winter Olympics
Alpine skiers at the 1994 Winter Olympics
Sportspeople from Miercurea Ciuc
20th-century Hungarian people